Azita Ghahreman  (born 1962 Mashhad, Iran) is an Iranian poet. She has written six books in Persian and three books in Swedish. 
She has also translated American poetry.

She has published four collections of poetry: Eve's Songs (1983), Sculptures of Autumn (1986), Forgetfulness is a Simple Ritual (1992) and The Suburb of Crows (2008), a collection reflecting on her exile in Sweden (she lives in an area called oxie on the outskirts of Malmö) that was published in both Swedish and Persian.

A collection of Ghahreman's work was published in Swedish in 2009, alongside the work of Sohrab Rahimi and Kristian Carlsson. She has also translated a collection of poems by the American poet and cartoonist, Shel Silverstein, The Place Where the Sidewalk Ends (2000), into Persian. She has edited three volumes of poems by poets from Khorasan, the eastern province of Iran, which has a rich and distinctive history.

Ghahreman's poems have been translated into various languages including English by Poetry Translation Centre. A new book of poetry, Under Hypnosis in Dr Caligari's Cabinet, was published in Sweden in April 2012.

Books

English 
  Poetry Translation Center London (2012) Featured translators: Maura Dooley, Elhum Shakerifar (collected poems in English) 
  Negative of a Group Photograph,(2018) Featured translators: Maura Dooley, Elhum Shakerifar,London Bloodaxe Books,

Persian 
  Avazhaaye havva ("Evas sånger") Ardeshir Förlag, Mashhad, Iran 1990,
  Tandishaaye paeezi ("Höstens skulpturer") Gole-Aftab förlag, Mashhad, Iran 1996,
  Faramooshi aine sadei daarad ("Glömskan är en enkel ceremoni") Nika Förlag, Mashhad, Iran 2002,
  Ghahreman, Azita (2009) (på per). Īnjā ḥūmih'hā-yi kalagh ast. Malmö: Smockadoll. Libris 11262348. 
  Zani aamad maraa bepooshad ("Kvinnan som kom för att klä mig"), Ahange-digar förlag, Teheran, Iran 2009,
  Shabih khaani ("Rekviem"), Arast förlag, Stavanger, Norge, 2012
  Hipnos dar matab doktor kaligari, Bootimar förlag, Teheran, Iran,2014
  Ghayeghi ke maraa aavard, Solens bokförlag, Malmö, Sverige,2014

Swedish 
  Ghahreman, Azita; Rahimi Sohrab, Carlsson Kristian (2009). Dikter: fyra diktsamlingar. Serie splint ; 002Smockadoll ; 006. Malmö: Smockadoll. Libris 11689694. 
  Ghahreman, Azita; Rahimi Sohrab, Carlsson Kristian (2012). Under hypnos i Dr. Caligaris kabinett. Serie splint ; 004. Malmö: Smockadoll. Libris 12752249. 
  Ghahreman, Azita; Rahimi Sohrab, Carlsson Kristian (2013). Serendips loggbok: dikter. Serie splint ; 009. Malmö: Smockadoll. Libris 14612104. 
  Ghahreman, Azita ;Rahimi Sohrab, Carlsson Kristian (2019). De mest jordliga sakernas anfall  ;Malmö : Smockadoll.

Translate 
  Jai ke piadero be payan miresad (originalets titel: Where the sidewalk ends, Shell Silverstein), tillsammans med Morteza Behravan, Hamrah förlag, Teheran (2000),från engelska till persiska
  roshanaye tariki (valda dikter av Tomas Tranströmer översatt till persiska), tillsammans med Sohrab Rahimi, Arast Förlag, Stavanger, (Norge 2012), från svenska till persiska
  a simple narrativ (valda dikter av Lundquist, Marie översatt till persiska) London: Hs Media. (2015),  från svenska till persiska
  Stad utan murar, city without borders (valda dikter av William-Olsson, Magnus översatt till persiska),London: Hs Media.(2015)   från svenska till persiska
  Zanhaa dar kopenhag (valda dikter av Hav, Niels översatt till persiska),Teheran: Bootimar , (2015) Från Danska till persiska
  Companion shade and wind,Författare: Shorab Rahimi,Översättare: Azita Ghahraman, (2017),från svenska till persiska

Awards
  2013: Prins Wilhelm, 2013, Sweden
  2014: Ludvig Nobles Prize, Udmurtia, Russia

References

External links
Azita Ghahreman homepage
 Azita Ghahreman, poetrytranslation.org

1962 births
Living people
20th-century Iranian poets
Iranian expatriates in Sweden
21st-century Iranian poets
Iranian women poets
Iranian translators
Translators to Persian
20th-century Iranian women writers
20th-century Iranian writers
21st-century Iranian women writers